The Municipality of Braslovče is a municipality in northern Slovenia. The seat of the municipality is the town of Braslovče. Most of the municipality, with the exception of the northern part of the village of Letuš, lies on the right bank of the Savinja River. The area is part of the traditional region of Styria. It is now included in the Savinja Statistical Region.

Settlements

In addition to the municipal seat of Braslovče, the municipality also includes the following settlements:

 Dobrovlje
 Glinje
 Gomilsko
 Grajska Vas
 Kamenče
 Letuš
 Male Braslovče
 Orla Vas
 Parižlje
 Podgorje pri Letušu
 Podvrh
 Poljče
 Preserje
 Rakovlje
 Šentrupert
 Šmatevž
 Spodnje Gorče
 Topovlje
 Trnava
 Zakl
 Zgornje Gorče

References

External links

 Municipality of Braslovče on Geopedia
 Braslovče municipal site

 
Braslovce
1998 establishments in Slovenia